"Stai fermo lì" is a song by Italian pop  singer Giusy Ferreri, released as third single from her debut album Gaetana. The song was written and produced by Italian Pop-R&B singer Tiziano Ferro.
It was released digitally in Italy and Switzerland on 16 January 2008.

Music video
The music video for "Stai fermo lì" was filmed on 14 and 15 January 2009 in Verona by Gaetano Morbioli, and was premiered on TG1 on 22 February 2009.

Formats and track listings

Digital single

 “Stai fermo lì" 4:09

Charts

Year-end charts

References

2009 singles
Giusy Ferreri songs
Italian-language songs
Songs written by Tiziano Ferro
2008 songs
Sony BMG singles